

Matches

Statistics

By competition

By season

By nation

Records
 Most appearances in Asian competition: Míchel, 8
 Most goals in Asian competition: Lu Lin, 2
 First Asian match: Guangzhou R&F 3–0 Warriors, AFC Champions League, preliminary round 2, 10 February 2015
 First goal scored in Asia: Jiang Zhipeng, against Warriors, in the AFC Champions League, 10 February 2015
 Biggest win: Guangzhou R&F 3–0 Warriors, in the AFC Champions League, 10 February 2015
 Biggest defeat:  Guangzhou R&F 0–5 Gamba Osaka, in the AFC Champions League, 22 April 2015  Buriram United 5–0 Guangzhou R&F, in the AFC Champions League, 6 May 2015
 Highest Asian home attendance: 9,308, against Buriram United, in the 2015 AFC Champions League, 3 March 2015
 Lowest Asian home attendance: 7,883, against Warriors, in the 2015 AFC Champions League, 10 February 2015

Goalscorers

See also 
Chinese clubs in the AFC Champions League

References 

Guangzhou City F.C.
Chinese football clubs in international competitions